Heaney Glacier is a glacier,  long, which lies close northwest of Cook Glacier and flows northeast and then east toward Saint Andrews Bay on the north coast of South Georgia. It was surveyed by the South Georgia Survey, 1951–52, and named by the UK Antarctic Place-Names Committee for John B. Heaney, a surveyor with that expedition.

See also
 List of glaciers in the Antarctic
 Glaciology

References

Glaciers of South Georgia